Countess Anna Karlovna Vorontsova, née Countess Skavronskaya ( – ), was a Russian lady in waiting, salonist and noble, cousin of the Empress Elizabeth of Russia. She was married to Chancellor Count Mikhail Illarionovich Vorontsov.

Life
She was the daughter of the elder brother of Catherine I of Russia, Karl Samoilovich Skavronsky, and Marya Ivanovna, and made a maid of honor at the court of her cousin, princess Elizabeth. Elizabeth was very fond of her cousin, and on 31 January 1742—a year after her accession to the throne—she had her marry Mikhail Illarionovich Vorontsov. On 25 April, she was made lady in waiting. Anna Karlovna loved fine arts, and her house was constantly visited by artists, writers, scientists, government people. She was described as beautiful, kind, charming and temperamental.

Anna Karlovna was constantly in the vicinity of the Empress, and Elizabeth was often informally in her home, where she met with all the foreign residents at the Russian court, and thanks to his spouse, her husband the Grand Chancellor exerted influence in foreign policy. 

On 9 February 1760 Anna Karlovna received the Order of St. Catherine's great cross. On 29 June 1760 Anna Karlovna was made chief gofmeysteriny. 

In the short reign of Peter III of Russia, the Vorontsovs belonged entirely to the party of the Emperor and is among those who accompanied him on 28 June 1762 in flight in the galley of Oranienbaum in Kronstadt. 

Widowed in 1767, the Countess Anna Karlovna did not play a prominent role at court, although the Tsarevich Pavel Petrovich called her aunt.

References
  Знаменитые россияне 18-19 веков. Биография и портреты. — С.-Петербург.: Лениздат, 1996. — с.31

1722 births
1775 deaths
Ladies-in-waiting from the Russian Empire
Countesses of the Russian Empire
Salon holders from the Russian Empire
Burials at Lazarevskoe Cemetery (Saint Petersburg)
Court of Elizabeth of Russia
Court of Catherine the Great